Semantic analysis (computational) within applied linguistics and computer science, is a composite of semantic analysis and computational components. Semantic analysis refers to a formal analysis of meaning, and computational refers to approaches that in principle support effective implementation in digital computers.

See also
 Computational semantics
 Natural language processing
 Semantic analytics
 Semantic analysis (machine learning)
 Semantic Web
 SemEval

References

Further reading
 Chris Fox (2010), "Computational Semantics", In Alexander Clark, Chris Fox, and Shalom Lappin, editors. The Handbook of Computational Linguistics and Natural Language Processing. Malden, MA: Wiley-Blackwell, 394-428.
 Agirre, Eneko, Lluis Marquez & Richard Wincentowski (2009), "Computational semantic analysis of language: SemEval-2007 and beyond", Language Resources and Evaluation 43(2):97-104

Computational linguistics
Natural language processing
Semantics
Computational fields of study